opened in Ōita, Ōita Prefecture, Japan, in 1999. The collection includes Nihonga, Yōga, Bungo Nanga, crafts, modern art, and the Important Cultural Property Materials relating to Tanomura Chikuden.

See also

 List of Cultural Properties of Japan - paintings (Ōita)
 Ōita Prefectural Art Museum

References

External links
  Ōita City Art Museum

Museums in Ōita Prefecture
Art museums and galleries in Japan
Museums established in 1999
1999 establishments in Japan
Ōita (city)